Deer River may refer to a water body or a community:

Canada
Deer River (Manitoba), a tributary of the Dog River

United Kingdom
River Deer, a tributary of the River Tamar in Cornwall

United States
Deer River (Michigan), a stream in Iron County
Deer River, Minnesota, a city and a stream in Itasca County
Deer River (Mississippi River), a river of Minnesota
Deer River (New Hampshire), a tributary of Ossipee Lake
Deer River (Black River), a tributary of the Black River (New York)
An unincorporated community in Lewis County, New York, named after the stream 
Deer River (St. Regis River), a tributary of the St. Regis River in New York

Other 
Red Deer River
Forked Deer River

See also 
Deer (disambiguation)
Deer Creek (disambiguation)